The Moscow trials were a series of show trials held by the Soviet Union between 1936 and 1938 at the instigation of Joseph Stalin. They were nominally directed  against "Trotskyists" and members of "Right Opposition" of the Communist Party of the Soviet Union. At the time the three Moscow trials were given extravagant titles:

 the "Case of the Trotskyite-Zinovievite Terrorist Center" (or Zinoviev-Kamenev Trial, also known as the 'Trial of the Sixteen', August 1936); 
 the "Case of the Anti-Soviet Trotskyist Center" (or Pyatakov-Radek Trial, also known as the 'Trial of the Seventeen', January 1937); and  
 the "Case of the Anti-Soviet "Bloc of Rights and Trotskyites"" (or the Bukharin-Rykov Trial, also known as the 'Trial of the Twenty-One', March 1938). 

The defendants were Old Bolshevik Party leaders and top officials of the Soviet secret police. Most were charged under Article 58 of the RSFSR Penal Code with conspiring with Imperialist powers to assassinate Stalin and other Soviet leaders, dismember the Soviet Union, and restore capitalism. Several prominent figures (such as Andrei Bubnov, Alexander Beloborodov, Nikolay Yezhov) were sentenced to death during this period outside these trials.

The Moscow trials led to the execution of many of the defendants. The trials are generally seen as part of Stalin's Great Purge, a campaign to rid the party of current or prior opposition, including Trotskyists and leading Bolshevik cadre members from the time of the Russian Revolution or earlier, who might even potentially become a figurehead for the growing discontent in the Soviet populace resulting from Stalin's mismanagement of the economy. Stalin's rapid industrialization during the period of the First Five Year Plan and the brutality of the forced agricultural collectivization had led to an acute economic and political crisis in 1928–1933, which led to the worsened conditions of  Soviet workers and peasants. Stalin was acutely conscious of this fact and took steps to prevent it taking the form of an opposition inside the Communist Party of the Soviet Union to his increasingly totalitarian rule.

Background

Grigory Zinoviev, Lev Kamenev, and Joseph Stalin formed a ruling triumvirate in early 1923 after Vladimir Lenin had become incapacitated from a stroke. In the context of the series of defeats of communist revolutions abroad (crucially the German revolutions of 1919, but also later the Chinese Revolution of 1927) which left the Russian Revolution increasingly isolated in a backward country, the triumvirate was able to effect the marginalization of Leon Trotsky in an internal party political conflict over the issue of Stalin's theory of Socialism in One Country. It was Trotsky who most clearly represented the wing of the CPSU leadership which claimed that the survival of the revolution depended on the spread of communism to the advanced European economies, especially Germany. This was expressed in his theory of permanent revolution. A few years later, Zinoviev and Kamenev joined the United Front in an alliance with Trotsky which favored Trotskyism and opposed Stalin specifically. Consequently, Stalin allied with Nikolai Bukharin and defeated Trotsky in a power struggle. Trotsky was expelled from the Soviet Union in 1929 and Kamenev and Zinoviev temporarily lost their membership in the Communist Party. 

Zinoviev and Kamenev, in 1932, were found to be complicit in the Ryutin Affair and again were temporarily expelled from the Communist Party. At this time, they entered in contact with Trotskyists in the USSR and again joined Trotsky against Stalin, this time in secret. They then formed a bloc of opposition with the trotskyists along with some rightists. Ivan Smirnov, also a defendant at the first Moscow Trial, was one of the Trotskyists leaders. Pierre Broué and a number of historians assumed that the opposition was dissolved after the arrest of Smirnov and Ryutin. However, some documents found after Broué's search showed that the Underground Left Opposition stayed active even in prison, in fact, the prisons became their centers of activities. In December 1934, Sergei Kirov was assassinated and, subsequently 15 defendants were found guilty of direct, or indirect, involvement in the crime and were executed. Zinoviev and Kamenev were found to be morally complicit in Kirov's murder and were sentenced to prison terms of ten and five years, respectively. Both Kamenev and Zinoviev had been secretly tried in 1935 but it appears that Stalin decided that, with suitable confessions, their fate could be used for propaganda purposes. Genrikh Yagoda oversaw the interrogation proceedings.

The "Anti-Soviet Trotskyist Center"

Conspiracy and investigation
In December 1935, the original case surrounding Zinoviev began to widen into what was called the "Trotsky-Zinoviev Center". Stalin allegedly received reports that correspondences from Trotsky were found among the possessions of one of those arrested in the widened probe. Consequently, Stalin stressed the importance of the investigation and ordered Nikolai Yezhov to take over the case and ascertain if Trotsky was involved. The central office of NKVD that was headed by Genrikh Yagoda was shocked when it was known that Yezhov (at that time a mere party functionary) has discovered the conspiracy, due to the fact that they (NKVD) had no relations to the case. This would have led to inevitable conclusion about unprofessionalism of the NKVD leaders who completely missed the existence of the conspiratorial Trotskyist center. In June 1936, Yagoda reiterated his belief to Stalin that there was no link between Trotsky and Zinoviev, but Stalin promptly rebuked him. Bewilderment was strengthened by the fact that both Zinoviev and Kamenev for a long time were under constant operational surveillance and after the murder of Kirov were held in custody. A key role in investigating played a chief of the Secret-political department of the NKVD Main Directory of State Security (a predecessor of KGB), State Security Commissar of the 2nd Class Georgy Molchanov.

The basis of the scenario was laid in confessions, extracted under torture, from three of the arrested. One was NKVD agent Valentin Olberg who taught at the Gorky Pedagogic Institute. The others were Soviet statesmen and former members of the internal Party opposition, Isaac Rejngold and Richard Pikel. Firmly believing in the mythical conspiracy, Rejngold executed the Party task with which he thought himself to be entrusted. In content, the testimonies present the standard items of supposed conspiratorial activities: the murder of Kirov; preparations to assassinate the leaders of the Soviet Communist Party; a readiness seizure of power in the USSR in order to "restore capitalism".

In July 1936, Zinoviev and Kamenev were brought to Moscow from an unspecified prison. They were interrogated and denied being part of any Trotsky-led conspiracy. Yezhov appealed to Zinoviev's and Kamenev's devotion to the Soviet Union as old Bolsheviks and advised them that Trotsky was fomenting anti-Soviet sentiment amongst the proletariat in the world. Throughout spring and summer of 1936 the investigators were requesting from the arrested "to lay down arms in front of the party" exerting a continuous pressure on them. Furthermore, this loss of support, in the event of a war with Germany or Japan, could have disastrous ramifications for the Soviet Union. To Kamenev specifically, Yezhov showed him evidence that his son was subject to an investigation that could result in his son's execution. According to one witness, at the beginning of the summer the central heating was turned on in Zinoviev's and Kamenev's cells. This was very unpleasant for both prisoners but particularly Zinoviev who was asthmatic and couldn't tolerate the artificially increased temperatures. Finally the exhausted prisoners agreed to a deal with Stalin who promised them, on the behalf of Politburo, their lives in exchange for participation in the anti-Trotskyist spectacle. Kamenev and Zinoviev agreed to confess on condition that they receive a direct guarantee from the entire Politburo that their lives and those of their families and followers would be spared. When they were taken to the supposed Politburo meeting, they were met by only Stalin and Kliment Voroshilov. Stalin explained that they were the "commission" authorized by the Politburo, and Stalin agreed to their conditions in order to gain their desired confessions. After that the future defendants were given some medical treatment and food.

Trial

The trial, with 16 defendants, was held from 19 to 24 August 1936 in the small October Hall of the House of the Unions (chosen instead of the larger Hall of Columns, used for earlier trials). The defendants were tried by the Military Collegium of the Supreme Court of the USSR, with Vasili Ulrikh presiding. The Prosecutor General was Andrei Vyshinsky, a former member of the Menshevik Party who in 1917 had signed an order for the arrest of Vladimir Ulyanov (Lenin).

The main charge was forming a terror organization with the purpose of killing Joseph Stalin and other members of the Soviet government. Defendant Ivan Nikitich Smirnov was blamed by his co-defendants for being the leader of the Center which planned Kirov's assassination. He, however, had been in prison since January 1933 and refused to confess. Another defendant, the Old Bolshevik Eduard Holtzman, was accused of conspiring with Trotsky in Copenhagen at the Hotel Bristol in 1932, where Trotsky was giving a public lecture. A week after the trial it was revealed by a Danish Social Democratic newspaper that the hotel had been demolished in 1917.

All of the defendants were sentenced to death and were subsequently shot in the cellars of Lubyanka Prison in Moscow by NKVD chief executioner Vasily Blokhin. The full list of defendants is as follows:
 Grigory Zinoviev
 Lev Kamenev
 Grigory Yevdokimov
 Ivan Bakayev
 Sergei Mrachkovsky, a hero of the Russian Civil War in Siberia and the Russian Far East
 Vagarshak Arutyunovich Ter-Vaganyan, leader of the Armenian Communist Party
 Ivan Nikitich Smirnov, People's Commissar for Posts and Telegraphs
 Yefim Dreitzer
 Isak Reingold
 Richard Pickel
 Eduard Holtzman
 Fritz David
 Valentin Olberg
 Konon Berman-Yurin
 Moissei Lurye
 Nathan Lurye

The "Parallel anti-Soviet Trotskyist Center"

The second trial occurred between 23 and 30 January 1937.

This trial involved 17 lesser figures including Karl Radek, Yuri Pyatakov, Grigory Sokolnikov, and Leonid Serebryakov. Alexander Beloborodov was also arrested and intended to be tried along with Radek, but did not make the confession required of him, and so he was not produced in court. Thirteen of the defendants were eventually executed by shooting (Pyatakov and Serebryakov among them). The rest (including Radek and Sokolnikov) received sentences in labour camps, where they were later murdered.
Radek was spared as he implicated others, including Nikolai Bukharin, Alexei Rykov, and Marshal Mikhail Tukhachevsky, setting the stage for the Trial of Military and Trial of the Twenty One.

Radek provided the pretext for the purge on a massive scale with his testimony that there was a "third organization separate from the cadres which had passed through [Trotsky's] school" as well as "semi-Trotskyites, quarter-Trotskyites, one-eighth-Trotskyites, people who helped us, not knowing of the terrorist organization but sympathizing with us, people who from liberalism, from a Fronde against the Party, gave us this help."

By the third organization, he meant the last remaining former opposition group called Rightists led by Bukharin, whom he implicated by saying:I feel guilty of one thing more: even after admitting my guilt and exposing the organisation, I stubbornly refused to give evidence about Bukharin. I knew that Bukharin's situation was just as hopeless as my own, because our guilt, if not juridically, then in essence, was the same. But we are close friends, and intellectual friendship is stronger than other friendships. I knew that Bukharin was in the same state of upheaval as myself. That is why I did not want to deliver him bound hand and foot to the People's Commissariat of Home Affairs. Just as in relation to our other cadres, I wanted Bukharin himself to lay down his arms.At the time, many Western observers who attended the trials said that they were fair and that the guilt of the accused had been established. They based this assessment on the confessions of the accused, which were freely given in open court, without any apparent evidence that they had been extracted by torture or drugging. U.S. ambassador Joseph E. Davies wrote in Mission to Moscow:

In view of the character of the accused, their long terms of service, their recognized distinction in their profession, their long-continued loyalty to the Communist cause, it is scarcely credible that their brother officers ... should have acquiesced in their execution, unless they were convinced that these men had been guilty of some offense. It is generally accepted by members of the Diplomatic Corps that the accused must have been guilty of an offense which in the Soviet Union would merit the death penalty.

 The Bukharin trial six months later developed evidence which, if true, more than justified this action. Undoubtedly those facts were all full known to the military court at this time.

All "confessions" were extracted under the most severe torture. The "trials" were carefully rehearsed and the interrogators/torturers sat in the front row apparently as a reminder as to what might happen if participants went off script. Images of the accused were not shown.

Trial of the Generals and the Tukhachevsky Affair

The Tukhachevsky Affair was a secret trial before a military tribunal of a group of Red Army generals, including Mikhail Tukhachevsky, in June 1937.

It featured the same type of frame-up of the defendants and it is traditionally considered one of the key trials of the Great Purge. Mikhail Tukhachevsky and the senior military officers Iona Yakir, Ieronim Uborevich, Robert Eideman, August Kork, Vitovt Putna, Boris Feldman, and Vitaly Primakov were accused of anti-Communist conspiracy and sentenced to death; they were executed on the night of June 11/12, immediately after the verdict delivered by a Special Session of the Supreme Court of the USSR. This trial triggered a massive purge of the Red Army.

The "Trial of the Anti-Soviet "Bloc of Rights and Trotskyites"

The third show trial, in March 1938, popularly known as The Trial of the Twenty-One, tied together all the loose threads from earlier trials.

The fact that Genrikh Yagoda was one of the accused showed the speed at which the purges were consuming its own. Meant to be the culmination of previous trials, it now alleged that Nikolai Bukharin and others had conspired to assassinate Lenin and Stalin numerous times after 1918 and had murdered Soviet writer Maxim Gorky by poison in 1936. The group also stood accused of espionage. Bukharin and others were claimed to have plotted the overthrow and dismemberment of the Soviet Union in collusion with agents of the German and Japanese governments, among other preposterous charges.

Even sympathetic observers who had stomached the earlier trials found it hard to swallow the new charges as they became ever more absurd, and the purge had now expanded to include virtually every living Old Bolshevik leader except Stalin. 

The preparation for this trial was delayed in its early stages due to the reluctance of some party members to denounce their comrades. It was at this time that Stalin personally intervened to speed up the process and replaced Yagoda with Yezhov. Stalin also observed some of the trial in person from a hidden chamber in the courtroom. On the first day of the trial, Nikolai Krestinsky caused a sensation when he repudiated his written confession and pleaded not guilty to all the charges. However, he changed his plea the next day after "special measures," which dislocated his left shoulder among other things.

Anastas Mikoyan and Vyacheslav Molotov later claimed that Bukharin was never tortured, but it is now known that his interrogators were given the order, "beating permitted," and were under great pressure to extract confessions out of the "star" defendant. Bukharin held out for three months, but threats to his young wife and infant son, combined with "methods of physical influence" wore him down. However, when he read his confession, amended and corrected personally by Stalin, he withdrew his whole confession. The examination started all over again, with a double team of interrogators.

Bukharin's confession

Bukharin's confession in particular became the subject of much debate among Western observers, inspiring Koestler's novel Darkness at Noon and a philosophical essay by Maurice Merleau-Ponty in Humanism and Terror among others. His confessions were somewhat different from others in that, while he pleaded guilty to general charges, he denied knowledge of any specific crimes. Some astute observers noted that he would allow only what was in his written confession and refused to go any further. The fact that he was allowed to write in prison (he wrote four book-length manuscripts including an autobiographical novel, How It All Began, a philosophical treatise, and a collection of poems – all of which were found in Stalin's archive and published in the 1990s) suggests that some kind of deal was reached as a condition for his confession. He also wrote a series of emotional letters to Stalin, protesting his innocence and professing his love for Stalin, which contrasts with his critical opinion of Stalin and his policies as expressed to others and with his conduct in the trial.

There are several possible interpretations of Bukharin's motivation (besides coercion) in the trial. Koestler and others viewed it as a true believer's last service to the Party (while preserving a modicum of personal honor), whereas Bukharin's biographers Stephen Cohen and Robert Tucker saw traces of Aesopian language, with which Bukharin sought to turn the tables and conduct a trial of Stalinism (while still keeping his part of the bargain to save his family). Bukharin himself speaks of his "peculiar duality of mind" in his last plea, which led to "semi-paralysis of the will" and Hegelian "unhappy consciousness."

The result was a curious mix of fulsome confessions and subtle criticisms of the trial. After disproving several charges against him (one observer noted that he proceeded to demolish, or rather showed he could very easily demolish, the whole case), Bukharin said that "the confession of the accused is not essential. The confession of the accused is a medieval principle of jurisprudence", his point being that the trial was solely based on coerced confessions. He finished his last plea with "the monstrousness of my crime is immeasurable, especially in the new stage of the struggle of the U.S.S.R. May this trial be the last severe lesson, and may the great might of the U.S.S.R. become clear to all."

Romain Rolland and others wrote to Stalin seeking clemency for Bukharin, but all the leading defendants were executed except Rakovsky and two others (they were killed in prison in 1941). Despite the promise to spare his family, Bukharin's wife, Anna Larina, was sent to a labor camp, but she survived.

Defendants 
The trial included 21 defendants alleged to belong to the "Bloc of Rights and Trotskyites":

Nikolai Bukharin – Marxist theoretician, former head of Communist International and member of Politburo
Alexei Rykov – former premier and member of Politburo
Nikolai Krestinsky – former member of Politburo and ambassador to Germany
Christian Rakovsky – former ambassador to Great Britain and France
Genrikh Yagoda – former head of NKVD
Arkady Rosengolts – former People's Commissar for Foreign Trade
Vladimir Ivanov – former People's Commissar for Timber Industry
Mikhail Alexandrovich Chernov – former People's Commissar for Agriculture
Grigori Grinko – former People's Commissar for Finance
Isaac Zelensky – former Secretary of Central Committee
Sergei Bessonov
Akmal Ikramov – Uzbek leader
Fayzulla Khodzhayev – Uzbek leader
Vasily Sharangovich – former first secretary in Belorussia
 Prokopy Zubarev
Pavel Bulanov – NKVD officer
Lev Levin – Kremlin doctor
Dmitry Pletnyov – Kremlin doctor
 Ignaty Kazakov – Kremlin doctor
 Venyamin Maximov-Dikovsky
Pyotr Kryuchkov

Aftermath
Communist Party leaders in most Western countries denounced criticism of the trials as capitalist attempts to subvert Communism.

A number of American communists and "fellow travellers" outside of the Soviet Union signed a Statement of American Progressives on the Moscow Trials. These included Langston Hughes and Stuart Davis, who would later express regrets.

Some contemporary observers who thought the trials were inherently fair cite the statements of Molotov, who while conceding that some of the confessions contain unlikely statements, said there may have been several reasons or motives for this—one being that the handful who made doubtful confessions were trying to undermine the Soviet Union and its government by making dubious statements in their confessions to cast doubts on their trial. Molotov postulated that a defendant might invent a story that he collaborated with foreign agents and party members to undermine the government so that those members would falsely come under suspicion, while the false foreign collaboration charge would be believed as well. Thus, the Soviet government was in his view the victim of false confessions. Nonetheless, he said the evidence of mostly out-of-power Communist officials conspiring to make a power grab during a moment of weakness in the upcoming war truly existed. This defense collapsed after the release of Khrushchev's Secret Speech to the Twentieth Congress.

In Britain, the lawyer and Labour MP Denis Nowell Pritt, for example, wrote: "Once again the more faint-hearted socialists are beset with doubts and anxieties," but "once again we can feel confident that when the smoke has rolled away from the battlefield of controversy it will be realized that the charge was true, the confessions correct and the prosecution fairly conducted," while socialist thinker Beatrice Webb "was pleased that Stalin had 'cut out the dead wood'." Communist Party leader Harry Pollitt, in the Daily Worker of March 12, 1936, told the world that "the trials in Moscow represent a new triumph in the history of progress." The article was ironically illustrated by a photograph of Stalin with Yezhov, himself shortly to vanish and his photographs airbrushed from history by NKVD censors.

In the United States, left-wing advocates such as Corliss Lamont and Lillian Hellman also denounced criticism of the Moscow trials, signing An Open Letter To American Liberals in support of the trials for the March 1937 issue of Soviet Russia Today. In the political atmosphere of the 1930s, the accusation that there was a conspiracy to destroy the Soviet Union was not incredible, and few outside observers were aware of the events inside the Communist Party that had led to the purge and the trials.

However, the Moscow trials were generally viewed negatively by most Western observers including many liberals. The New York Times noted the absurdity in an editorial on March 1, 1938: "It is as if twenty years after Yorktown somebody in power at Washington found it necessary for the safety of the State to send to the scaffold Thomas Jefferson, Madison, John Adams, Hamilton, Jay and most of their associates. The charge against them would be that they conspired to hand over the United States to George III." 

For Bertram Wolfe, the outcome of the Bukharin trial marked his break with Stalinism.

The Dewey Commission 

In May 1937, the Commission of Inquiry into the Charges Made against Leon Trotsky in the Moscow trials, commonly known as the Dewey Commission, was set up in the United States by supporters of Trotsky, to establish the truth about the trials. The commission was headed by the noted American philosopher and educator John Dewey, who led a delegation to Mexico, where Trotsky lived, to interview him and hold hearings from April 10 to April 17, 1937. The hearings were conducted to investigate the allegations against Trotsky who publicly stated in advance of them that if the commission found him guilty as charged he would hand himself over to the Soviet authorities. They brought to light evidence which established that some of the specific charges made at the trials could not be true.

The Dewey Commission published its findings in the form of a 422-page book titled Not Guilty. Its conclusions asserted the innocence of all those condemned in the Moscow trials. In its summary the commission wrote: "Independent of extrinsic evidence, the Commission finds:
 That the conduct of the Moscow trials was such as to convince any unprejudiced person that no attempt was made to ascertain the truth.
 That while confessions are necessarily entitled to the most serious consideration, the confessions themselves contain such inherent improbabilities as to convince the Commission that they do not represent the truth, irrespective of any means used to obtain them."
 That Trotsky never instructed any of the accused or witnesses in the Moscow trials to enter into agreements with foreign powers against the Soviet Union [and] that Trotsky never recommended, plotted, or attempted the restoration of capitalism in the USSR.

The commission concluded: "We therefore find the Moscow Trials to be frame-ups." For example, in Moscow, Pyatakov had testified that he had flown to Oslo in December 1935 to "receive terrorist instructions" from Trotsky. The Dewey Commission established that no such flight had taken place.

British Provisional Committee 
In Britain, the trials were also subject to criticism. A group called the British Provisional Committee for the Defence of Leon Trotsky was set up. In 1936, the Committee published an open letter in the Manchester Guardian calling for an international inquiry into the Trials. The letter was signed by several notable
figures, including H. N. Brailsford, Harry Wicks, Conrad Noel, Frank Horrabin and Eleanor Rathbone. The Committee also supported the Dewey Commission. Emrys Hughes, the British MP, also attacked the Moscow trials as unjust in his newspaper Forward.

Legacy
All of the surviving members of the Lenin-era party leadership except Stalin, Trotsky and Kalinin, were tried. By the end of the final trial Stalin had arrested and executed almost every important living Bolshevik from the Revolution. Of 1,966 delegates to the party congress in 1934, 1,108 were arrested. Of 139 members of the Central Committee, 98 were arrested. Three out of five Soviet marshals (Alexander Ilyich Yegorov, Vasily Blyukher, Tukhachevsky) and several thousands of the Red Army officers were arrested or shot. The key defendant, Leon Trotsky, was living in exile abroad, but he still did not survive Stalin's desire to have him dead and was assassinated by a Soviet agent in Mexico in 1940.

While Khrushchev's Secret Speech denounced Stalin's personality cult and purges as early as 1956, rehabilitation of Old Bolsheviks proceeded at a slow pace. Nikolai Bukharin and 19 other co-defendants were officially completely rehabilitated in February 1988. Yagoda, who was deeply involved in the great purge as the head of NKVD, was not included. In May 1988, rehabilitation of Zinoviev, Kamenev, Radek, and co-defendants was announced.

After the death of Stalin, Nikita Khrushchev repudiated the trials in a speech to the Twentieth Congress of the Communist Party of the Soviet Union:

It is now known that the confessions were given only after great psychological pressure and torture had been applied to the defendants. From the accounts of former GPU officer Alexander Orlov and others the methods used to extract the confessions are known: repeated beatings, torture, making prisoners stand or go without sleep for days on end, and threats to arrest and execute the prisoners' families. For example, Kamenev's teenage son was arrested and charged with terrorism. After months of such interrogation, the defendants were driven to despair and exhaustion.

In January 1989, the official newspaper Pravda reported that 25,000 persons had been posthumously rehabilitated.

In literature
Grieg, Nordahl. The world must still be young [Ung må verden endnu være]
 Koestler, Arthur. [1940] 1980. Darkness at Noon. London: The Folio Society.
Maclean, Fitzroy. 1949. Eastern Approaches
 Orwell, George. 1944. Animal Farm
 Serge, Victor. The Case of Comrade Tulayev

In films 
The trials are also mentioned in the 1939 film Ninotchka, where when asked about news from Russia, the title character tells Soviet agents in Paris that "The last mass trials were a great success. There are going to be fewer but better Russians."
The trials were in "Mission to Moscow" displayed in the USA during the last phase of trial of Trotsky's assassin Monard-Jacson. This movie displayed Trotsky and Trotskites as Hitler's agents and generated sympathy towards the assassin of Trotsky thus.

See also
 Vasiliy Ulrikh
 Kommunarka shooting ground
 mass graves in the Soviet Union

Notes

References

Bibliography

Primary sources
 "The Case of the Trotskyite-Zinovievite Terrorist Centre" (report of court proceedings). Moscow: People's Commissariat of Justice of the U.S.S.R. 1936.
 "The Case of the Anti-Soviet Trotskyite Centre." Moscow. 1937.
 "The Case of the Anti-Soviet 'Bloc of Rights and Trotskyites'." Moscow. 1938.
 Khrushchev, Nikita. 1956. "On the Cult of Personality and Its Consequences" (speech to the 20th Communist Party Congress).
 Sedov, Lev. 1938. The Red Book on the Moscow Trial: Documents. New York: New Park Publications.

Secondary sources
 Conquest, Robert. 1990. The Great Terror: A Reassessment. New York: Oxford University Press. .
 Hessen, Robert, ed. 1990. Breaking with Communism: The Intellectual Odyssey of Bertram D. Wolfe. Stanford: Hoover Institution Press. .
 Leno, Matthew L. 2010. The Kirov Murder and Soviet History. New Haven: Yale University Press. .
 Orlov, Alexander. 1953. The Secret History of Stalin's Crimes. Random House, Inc.
 Redman, Joseph. March–April 1958. "The British Stalinists and the Moscow Trials." Labour Review 3(2).
 Rogovin, Vadim Z. 1998. 1937: Stalin's Year of Terror. Oak Park, MI: Mehring Books, Inc. .
 Snyder, Timothy. 2010. Bloodlands: Europe Between Hitler and Stalin. New York: Basic Books. .
 Tucker, Robert C. 1973. Stalin as Revolutionary, 1879–1929: A Study in History and Personality. New York: Norton. .

Further reading
 Getty, J. Arch and Naumov, Oleg V. (2010). The Road to Terror: Stalin and the Self-destruction of the Bolsheviks, 1932–1939. New Haven: Yale University Press. .
 Goldman, Wendy Z. (2011). Inventing the Enemy: Denunciation and Terror in Stalin's Russia. New York: Cambridge University Press. .

Events in Moscow
Great Purge
Soviet show trials
Trials in Russia
Political and cultural purges
Soviet law
Stalinism
Right Opposition
Trial of the Sixteen (Great Purge)